Vinokurov, feminine: Vinokurova, (also Winokurow, Winokurowa) is a Russian occupational surname derived from the word "винокур", which is an archaic name of the profession of spirit distilling. The Ukrainian-language version is Vynokurov, Vynokurova

The surname may refer to:

 Andriy Vynokurov, Ukrainian professional track cyclist
Alexander Vinokurov, Soviet statesman
Alexander Vinokourov, Kazakh professional road bicycle racer
Eduard Vinokurov (1942–2010), Kazakh-born Soviet Olympic and world champion fencer
Evgeny Vinokurov (born 1975), Russian economist
 (1925-1993), Russian poet 
Vadym Vinokurov, Ukrainian footballer

See also
 
Vinokur

Russian-language surnames
Occupational surnames